Tommy Dempsey (born January 27, 1974) is an American college basketball coach and former head men's basketball coach at Binghamton University and Rider.

Coaching career
Dempsey began his college coaching career in 2000 as the head coach at Keystone College, where he led the team to a 55–8 record in two seasons guiding the team to a NJCAA Division III Final Four appearance. For the 2002–03 season, Dempsey spent a season at Lackawanna College where he guided the team the NJCAA Division II title game and a 33–4 overall record.

Rider
Dempsey joined the coaching staff at Rider as an assistant in 2003, serving in the position for two seasons before being elevated to head coach during the 2005–06 season as the Broncs went 8–20. The team doubled its win total a year later and by his third year at the helm, Rider recorded a school record 23-win season with the help of future NBA first round pick Jason Thompson. Over the next four years, Dempsey had 82 wins, which was the most in Rider history, while also guiding the team to three postseason appearances.

Dempsey compiled a 119–105 record in seven seasons at Rider.

Binghamton
Dempsey was hired at Binghamton in May 2012, taking over for Mark Macon, inheriting a team that went 2–29 in 2011–12. After nine seasons and a 72–194 overall record, Dempsey's contract was not renewed.

Head coaching record

College

References

1974 births
Living people
American men's basketball coaches
American men's basketball players
Basketball coaches from Pennsylvania
Basketball players from Pennsylvania
Binghamton Bearcats men's basketball coaches
College men's basketball head coaches in the United States
Junior college men's basketball coaches in the United States
Rider Broncs men's basketball coaches
Sportspeople from Scranton, Pennsylvania
Susquehanna River Hawks men's basketball players